Herman Henrik Julius Lynge (November 13, 1822–May 12, 1897)  was a Danish antiquarian bookseller. He continued and owned the first antiquarian bookshop in Scandinavia, now “Herman H. J. Lynge & Søn A/S”.

Life

Career 
Lynge was born in Copenhagen, Denmark, as the son of a bookbinder. At a very young age, before he was even confirmed, he began his apprenticeship as a bookseller, and the shop in which he took his education was carefully chosen by his father, Henrik Berndt Lynge. His master was Christian Tønder Sæbye (1789-1844), who had started his bookshop, initially a second-hand shop focusing on books, in 1821 on Gothersgade 26. After his apprenticeship, Lynge continued to work in the company, and when Sæbye died in 1844, the young man, only aged twenty-two, took over as manager of the bookshop, which was still owned by the Sæbye family. In 1853 Lynge was able to buy the bookshop from the family at the price of 1,000 rix-dollars, and at the same time he took out a trade licence as a bookseller. In the first years the cholera was harrying Copenhagen, and Lynge is said to have done great business at the time due to the large number of private libraries offered for sale; he was the only proper “antiquarian bookseller” in Denmark, and he often spited the danger of infection and personally collected the large number of books in the homes of the ill.

When N.C. Ditlewsen died in 1853, Lynge also bought his stock and took over his locations in Købmagergade 45.  From the advertisement section in the Copenhagen Directory of 1856 it is known that the company, in the beginning called “Herman H.J. Lynge (Sæbyeske Boghandling)” and a few years later merely “Herman H.J. Lynge”, had a stock of antiquarian books amounting to 80,000 volumes among which were “many ancient prints, rarities, beautiful reprints, magnificent copies etc.”
Due to his knowledge and the considerable size of the bookshop, Lynge had connections to almost all libraries and collectors at the time, and he supplied numerous Danish and foreign libraries with books. From the very beginning he took part in book auctions, and it is now widely accepted that it was probably him and his staff, who made the auctioneer’s sales record of the library of Søren Kierkegaard, when he died in November 1855. Doubt has been raised as to this conclusion, due to the catalogue not being especially well made, and knowing the thoroughness and knowledge of Lynge it sounds improbable that he should have made a catalogue, which is far from perfect. However, the catalogue could be bought at “Herman H.J. Lynge”, and it is difficult to see, who else would have been able to finish such a catalogue in the very short amount of time that passed between the death of Kierkegaard and the auction. 

In 1871 Lynge attracted much attention, when he sold a huge Holberg collection of 425 works to the book collector F.S. Bang, who donated the collection to Sorø Akademi, where it still is today. Even more astonishing, though, was the fact that after his death it was discovered that he had actually succeeded in creating another collection of Holbergiana, this time consisting of 880 items. Business was going extremely well for Lynge and in 1868 he had to move to larger locations, this time to Valkendorfsgade 8.

The Man
Lynge was a member of several literary and scientific academies, was awarded the Danish and the Swedish gold Order of Merit, and was appointed Knight of the Swedish Vasaorden. When he turned 70, he was awarded the chancellery-title, a Danish title (Kancelliråd), which was a great honour received by few. 

When the famous Danish poet, Christian Winther, was short of money, Lynge bought a selected collection of his best books, paid them in cash, as he always did, and then wrapped up the books, until Winther was able to buy back the books at the same price. He also donated books to libraries, for instance in 1864 when he presented the Danish Royal Library with a copy of the New Testament, which had belonged to Kierkegaard and had his handwritten notes in it. Due to his large amount of important and rare scientific books, he was an important person in the scientific environment in Denmark, and often lent a scientist valuable works necessary for scientific studies, but too expensive for the person to buy, though sometimes the book was not handed back. He also willingly lent pictures from his large collection to exhibitions and for the use of illustrations. Lynge was an eager collector, and his collection of coins was especially well known. He also collected medals, paintings, graphic art and portraits.

Death
The “Old Lynge” died in 1897, and in the D.B.L. (Danish Biographical Lexicon) he is characterized as “the first proper antiquarian bookseller in Denmark. As a role-model his importance to the development of the antiquarian book trade in Denmark has been huge” and “he raised the trade above the average level and gave it a position that had previously been lacking.” It is told that there was not a question about books that he could not answer immediately.

Continuation of the book shop
The son of the old Lynge, Herman Johannes Vilhelm Lynge, had been working in his father’s bookshop since his confirmation. In 1892 he became an associate, and the company changed its name to “Herman H.J. Lynge & Søn A/S”. When his father died, Lynge Jr. took over the business, in spite of his immense interest in scientific zoology. Lynge Jr. continued the tradition of his father perfectly and from an advertisement it is evident that early on he had increased the stock to 300,000 volumes. He moved the bookshop to larger locations across the street in Løvstræde. Lynge Jr. was also known as a very knowledgeable and generous man, and he enhanced the scientific profile of the bookshop. Due to his encountering so many scientists in the bookshop, his interest in zoology was only increased, and he actually succeeded in becoming an international authority in the field of molluscs and tropical mussels, mainly specializing in the left-oriented snails. Due to his expertise, he was assigned to investigate the collection of these snails brought home from the Danish expedition to Siam (1899-1900), and in 1909 his main work appeared: Marine Lamellibranchiata, containing five plates and a map and written in English. Lynge Jr. was also honoured for his merits and was announced Knight of Dannebrog. His principle of business was to “solve any assignment from best conviction”.

Herman J.V. Lynge’s son, Flemming Lynge, worked in the bookshop for a while, but his interest in the theatre was too great, and he did not continue the family tradition, but became a writer. In 1932 Lynge sold the bookshop to Axel Sandal (1885-1974), who already owned the bookshop “C.A. Reitzel”. Lynge continued to be connected to the bookshop until he became too old and had to retire. He died in 1945, aged eighty-two. The leader of the bookshop immediately became Arne Stuhr, who continued his leadership until 1974, when the old bookshop was bought by Käthe and Max Girsel, who, in 1978, moved the shop to Silkegade 11, where it still is today, continuing the strong tradition of Lynge. The bookshop has always been placed in the centre of Copenhagen.

References
This article incorporates text from the “Dansk Bibliografisk Leksikon”, “Salmonsens Konversationsleksikon”, “Fra de gamle Bøgers Verden”, 1953 and Poul Holst, “Antikvarboghandel I Danmark 1640-1980”, 1980.

External links 
Official web site of Herman H.J. Lynge & Søn A/S

1822 births
1897 deaths
Antiquarian booksellers
19th-century Danish businesspeople
Danish booksellers
Recipients of the Order of Vasa
Knights of the Order of the Dannebrog